Susannah  is an Australian botanical artist.

Blaxill was born and currently lives in Australia, but lived in England for about 17 years, where she became a member of the Society of Botanical Artists. Blaxill is internationally recognised as a leading artist specialising in watercolour, pencil and charcoal drawings. Her most famous work is a beetroot featured in multiple media around the world.

References

External links
 Artist's own site

Year of birth missing (living people)
Living people
21st-century Australian women artists
21st-century Australian painters
Botanical illustrators